The Silent Scream, popularly released under the truncated title, Silent Scream, is a 1979 American slasher film directed by Denny Harris, and starring Rebecca Balding, Cameron Mitchell, Barbara Steele and Yvonne De Carlo. The film follows a college student who finds rooming in a hilltop boarding house where a homicidal killer is on the loose.

The film was given a limited theatrical release in November 1979 through American Cinema Releasing. After it performed favorably at the box office, its release was expanded in January 1980. It went on to become one of the most financially successful independent horror films of the 1970s, grossing $7.9 million at the box office.

Plot
Scotty Parker, a college student in Southern California, is seeking a room for the fall semester at the last-minute. She is directed to a boarding house run by the standoffish Mrs. Engels; a Victorian mansion on a cliffside overlooking the Pacific Ocean. Mrs. Engels lives in the house along with her teenage son, Mason, and several other college students, including Doris, Peter, and Jack. The four students become friends, and decide to go on a double date together. Afterward, Doris and Peter walk along the beach near the house. Peter, drunk, makes unwanted advances on her, and Doris leaves him on the beach. He falls unconscious, and is awakened by an unseen assailant who stabs him to death with a butcher knife.

Lieutenant McGiver and Sergeant Manny Rusin are assigned to investigate Peter's murder, and Lt. McGiver grows suspicious of Mrs. Engels and her son. One afternoon, Scotty and Doris meet in the basement laundry room, where Doris tells her she is planning on moving after what happened to Peter. Scotty returns to her room with Jack, and the two begin to have sex. Meanwhile, in the basement, a woman bursts out of a hidden door, stabbing Doris numerous times in the head and chest.

The woman flees through the secret door, which opens to a hidden staircase that travels along the house's air ducts, eventually leading to a room located off the main attic space. Scotty goes downstairs to get her laundry, where she finds a pool of blood, and Doris gone. She discovers the secret door, and ascends the staircase. At the top, she finds a narrow hallway with a door at the end. She attempts to open it, and is attacked by the woman, who pulls her inside. The commotion alarms Mrs. Engels, who enters the room from an access door in the attic and intervenes.

Mrs. Engels reveals that the woman, Victoria, is her daughter. Mason chastises his mother for having taken in boarders at the house, knowing of Victoria's violent outbursts. Mrs. Engels then reveals to Mason that Victoria is in fact his mother: After a suicide attempt, she gave birth to him, but was left mute and homicidal after undergoing a botched lobotomy at a psychiatric hospital. Meanwhile, Jack searches for Scotty throughout the house, but is unable to find her. He is confronted by Mason downstairs, who knocks him unconscious.

At the police station, Sgt. Rusin uncovers a file on Victoria's past and determines she has been living in the Engels home after being taken out of the psychiatric hospital; he and Lt. McGiver promptly leave to go to the boarding house. Meanwhile, with Scotty bound and gagged in a closet, Mrs. Engels attempts to console the childlike Victoria. Mason obtains a gun from his bedroom and returns to the attic, attempting to kill Victoria. In a struggle, he inadvertently shoots Mrs. Engels through the chest, killing her. With his back turned, Victoria approaches Mason. He turns around, and she stares at him blankly, moving closer with a knife. Cornered against a window, he shoots her, and then shoots himself in the head.

Scotty manages to free herself, but finds Victoria has survived the gunshot; she attacks Scotty with the knife. Jack awakens just as Lt. McGiver and Sgt. Rusin arrive at the house. They enter the attic and find Victoria collapsed with a knife in her stomach. Jack consoles Scotty as Victoria dies on the floor.

Cast

Production

The film had a tumultuous post-production process where a large portion of the film was re-shot. Diane McBain recalled that she was cast as a police detective in September 1977 when the film began shooting in the Smith Estate, Highland Park, Los Angeles, Eagle Rock, Los Angeles and Occidental College with the film written and directed by Denny Harris.  The film was considered un-releasable. Harris brought in brothers Jim and Ken Wheat who rewrote the script.  In early 1978 a new series of actors including Yvonne De Carlo, Barbara Steele and Cameron Mitchell were brought in for new shooting.  Only 15% of the original footage remained in the film.  McBain was told that her character of a female police detective was "unbelievable" with her role reshot with Mitchell as the detective.

Release

Box office
The Silent Scream was released theatrically by American Cinema Releasing; it had a limited regional release, opening in Tulare, California on November 15, 1979 and Honolulu, Hawaii on November 19, 1979.

Because the film performed well during its initial release, American Cinema Releasing expanded it to 131 theaters throughout California in January 1980. The film had its Los Angeles opening on January 18, 1980. During the first week of its January 1980 release, the film grossed $1.67 million.
According to the chart book by Leonidas Fragias, it was a number one film in cinemas for the weekend of 6 February 1980.

Critical response
Tom Buckley of The New York Times panned the film, writing: "The only frightening thing about Silent Scream is that there are people who will pay $5 to see it... Everything about the production is repulsively amateurish, and it is saddening to see performers like Yvonne De Carlo and Cameron Mitchell reduced to appearing in it." The Philadelphia Inquirers Desmond Ryan praised the camerawork as "adept" but ultimately deemed the film "crude and ineffective for the apparent reason that Harris is so absorbed in technique—in how a grasping hand or wielded knife is to be filmed—that he has ignored just about every other aspect of making a film." Hal Lipper of the Dayton Daily News deemed the film a "carbon copy of Halloween," though he praised Balding as a "competent actress" and added that the film's finale "looks as though it came from a Charles Manson therapy session." Robert Masulo, a critic for The Sacramento Bee, praised the film's cinematography, but felt the performances were "without inspiration," and the screenplay "overflowing with clichés."

Linda Gross of the Los Angeles Times was more favorable in her assessment, writing that "despite indulgences in improbable plotting and predictable gore, The Silent Scream is a scary, stylish Grand Guignol horror movie," adding that director Harris "rarely miscalculates his shocks, and his quiet moments are even better." The Boston Globes Michael Blowen also gave the film a favorable review, summarizing: "In spite of its obvious flaws, Silent Scream is the best low-budget horror film since Halloween. If that sounds like damning with faint praise, so be it."

Home media
The film was released on VHS by Media Home Entertainment and Video Treasures.

The film was released by Scorpion Releasing on DVD in 2009 and on Blu-ray in 2017.

Notes

References

Sources

External links 

American slasher films
1979 films
1979 horror films
1970s slasher films
American serial killer films
American independent films
Films shot in Los Angeles
Matricide in fiction
1970s English-language films
1970s American films